Animal Tails is an American television variety show for teenage animal lovers. Hosted by comedian Mark Curry, the series highlights different features of the animal kingdom, from pets to more exotic animals. Reruns of this series currently air Saturday mornings on Bounce TV.

References

External links

PAX TV original programming
American educational television series
2000s American variety television series
2003 American television series debuts
English-language television shows